Oregon Route 46, also known as Caves Highway, is an Oregon state highway that runs between the city of Cave Junction and the Oregon Caves National Monument and Preserve. OR 46 traverses the Oregon Caves Highway No. 38 of the Oregon state highway system.

The two-lane road is paved with asphalt along its entire length.

Route description 
OR 46 starts in Cave Junction, at an intersection with U.S. Route 199. It then heads east into the Siskiyou Mountains, terminating at a parking lot for the Oregon Caves National Monument and Preserve. A forest service road (Grayback Road, NF-4611) splits east from OR 46, eventually reaching the Rogue Valley and Oregon Route 238.

Major intersections

References 

046
Transportation in Josephine County, Oregon